The Pennsylvania College of Art & Design (PCA&D) is a private, non-profit art and design college in Lancaster, Pennsylvania. The college offers Bachelor of Fine Arts (BFA) degrees and certificates, a continuing education program with professional certificates, and a wide variety of credit and non-credit studio and computer courses.  PCA&D is accredited by the National Association of Schools of Art and Design (NASAD) and the Middle States Commission on Higher Education (MSCHE).  

PCA&D was founded in 1982 as the Pennsylvania School of the Arts in Marietta, Pennsylvania, by faculty and staff from the recently closed York Academy of Arts.  The college received NASAD accreditation in 1984.  In 1987, PCA&D moved to its current location in downtown Lancaster.  In 2008, the college received MSCHE accreditation.

PCA&D is a member of the Association of Independent Colleges of Art and Design and the Association of Independent Colleges and Universities of Pennsylvania.

Degree Programs
PCA&D offers six degree programs in Animation & Game Art, Fine Art, Graphic Design, Illustration, Live Experience Design, Photography & Video.

References

External links
Official website

Educational institutions established in 1982
Art schools in Pennsylvania
Universities and colleges in Lancaster, Pennsylvania
1982 establishments in Pennsylvania
Private universities and colleges in Pennsylvania